The Eastern Panamanian montane forests (NT0122) is an ecoregion in the east of Panama and the extreme northwest of Colombia.
It contains diverse flora and fauna, with considerable endemism.
The ecoregion is largely intact due to its inaccessibility, although the opening of an extension of the Pan-American Highway has introduced threats from human activity.

Geography

Location 

The ecoregion covers several separate areas of higher ground in Panama and the adjoining border region of Colombia.
In the east the ecoregion is found on mountains surrounded by Chocó–Darién moist forests. 
Further west it is found on mountains surrounded by Isthmian-Atlantic moist forests..

Terrain 
The region is one where the Caribbean Plate is riding over the Nazca Plate and the Cocos Plate, causing tectonic instability and volcanic activity.
The Cordillera de San Blas and the Serranía del Darién are in the northeast, the latter containing the  Cerro Tacarcuna.
The south holds isolated chains of mountains such as the Serrania de Jungurudó, the Serranía de Bagre  and the Serranía del Baudó beside the Pacific coast.
The Eastern Panamanian montane forests ecoregion lies at elevations above .

Climate 
Annual rainfall is typically .
The central mountains receive less rain, averaging  while the mountains along the Caribbean coast receive .
At a sample location at  the Köppen climate classification is Af: equatorial; fully humid.

Ecology 
The ecoregion is in the neotropical realm, in the tropical and subtropical moist broadleaf forests biome.

Flora 

At the upper levels the trees give way to páramo grasslands.
The forests are complex, with great diversity and considerable endemism.
Types of vegetation at the lower levels include semi-deciduous tropical moist forest, the most common form, as well as swamp forests and marshes.
The semi-deciduous forest canopy trees include pochote (Pachira quinata), yuco de monte (Pachira sessilis), guanacaste (Enterolobium cyclocarpum), Licania hypoleuca, Platypodium elegans, ceibo barrigón (Pseudobombax septenatum), Panama tree (Sterculia apetala), nargusta (Terminalia amazonia), Tetragastris panamensis and taruma (Vitex cymosa).

At higher elevations the dominant canopy tree in the premontane and montane wet forests is wild cashew (Anacardium excelsum).
Other common canopy trees include Bombacopsis species, snakewood (Brosimum guianense), kapok tree (Ceiba pentandra), Cochlospermum orinocense, almendro (Dipteryx panamensis) and balsam of Peru (Myroxylon balsamum). 
Mapora palm (Oenocarpus mapora) is the dominant sub-canopy tree and Mabea occidentalis is the dominant shrub in the understory. 
Above  there are cloud forests dominated by mapora palm.
Higher up there are elfin forests dominated by Clusia species.

Fauna 

The Eastern Panamanian montane forests ecoregion, situated on the land bridge between the Americas, and with different elevations and climates, has diverse fauna.
Species from the north and south have mixed, and endemic species have appeared. Darien Province has about 770 species of vertebrates. Primates are gray-bellied night monkey (Aotus lemurinus – at the northern end of its range), Geoffroy's spider monkey (Ateles geoffroyi), black-headed spider monkey (Ateles fusciceps), Geoffroy's tamarin (Saguinus geoffroyi – endemic to Costa Rica, Panama and northwest Colombia), mantled howler (Alouatta palliata) and white-headed capuchin (Cebus capucinus). Cats are cougar (Puma concolor), jaguar (Panthera onca), ocelot (Leopardus pardalis), margay (Leopardus wiedii), jaguarundi (Puma yagouaroundi) and oncilla (Leopardus tigrinus). Endangered mammals include black-headed spider monkey, Geoffroy's spider monkey and Baird's tapir (Tapirus bairdii).

The ecoregion is the northernmost area for South American birds such as saffron-headed parrot (Pyrilia pyrilia), oilbird (Steatornis caripensis) and golden-headed quetzal (Pharomachrus auriceps). Endemic birds to the ecoregion also inhabit the Choco-Darién moist forests to the south. They include the bare-shanked screech owl (Megascops clarkii), beautiful treerunner (Margarornis bellulus), blue-and-gold tanager (Bangsia arcaei), green-naped tanager (Tangara fucosa), Nariño tapaculo (Scytalopus vicinior), Pirre hummingbird (Goldmania bella), Pirre warbler (Basileuterus ignotus), russet-crowned quail-dove (Zentrygon goldmani), sooty-faced finch (Arremon crassirostris), Tacarcuna bush tanager (Chlorospingus tacarcunae), Tacarcuna tapaculo (Scytalopus panamensis), Tacarcuna wood quail (Odontophorus dialeucos), varied solitaire (Myadestes coloratus), violet-capped hummingbird (Goldmania violiceps) and yellow-collared chlorophonia (Chlorophonia flavirostris).

There are 24 species of endangered amphibians and reptiles in the Darién National Park. Endangered amphibians include the horned marsupial frog (Gastrotheca cornuta).

Status 
The World Wide Fund for Nature (WWF) gives the ecoregion the status "Relatively Stable/Intact".
It has avoided widespread damage due to its steep and inaccessible slopes, and there are still large, intact blocks.
However, the opening of the Pan-American Highway has caused colonization from central Panama, with increases in slash-and-burn farming, gold mining and the illegal capture of macaws, parrots, and passerine birds for sale.

The ridge of the Llorona San Blas is in the Kuna Indian Reserve of San Blas, and is protected by the indigenous Kuna people. 
The  Darién National Park protects a large area of the ecoregion.
Other protected areas are the Kuna de Walá Mortí, Nurrá and Comarca Emberá-Wounaan indigenous reserves, the  Canglon Forest Reserve and the  Chepigana Forest Reserve.

References

Bibliography 

 
 
 

Neotropical tropical and subtropical moist broadleaf forests
Ecoregions of Colombia
Ecoregions of Panama
Montane forests